Universal Energy Corporation is a Canadian electric utility and natural gas retailer headquartered in Toronto, Ontario, with offices throughout North America. It focuses on long-term sales of residential, commercial, and industrial natural gas in the provinces of Ontario and British Columbia. It is a wholly owned subsidiary of Universal Energy Group.

History

In January 2009, the Ontario Energy Board announced that it intended to fine Universal Energy Corporation $200,000CA for making "false, misleading or deceptive statements to consumers." The announcement was the first such announcement since June 2003.

Canadian Billionaire Mark Silver is the company's founder and CEO.

Ontario MPP Frank Klees sits on its board.  Klees also received the single biggest contribution to his campaign to run as leader of the Progressive Conservative Party of Ontario from OPTUS Capital Corporation owned by Silver.

See also
Electricity policy of Ontario

Footnotes

External links
Canadian customer website

Natural gas companies of Canada
Electric power companies of Canada